Goodsprings Waste Heat Recovery Station is a 7.5MW heat recovery system located in Goodsprings, Nevada.  The plant uses the waste heat generated by the Goodsprings Compressor Station on the Kern River Pipeline to generate electricity.  The plant is owned and operated by NV Energy and is the first renewable energy plant owned by the company.

The plant which cost $22 million was constructed by Ormat Technologies construction began in March 2010 and began operations in November.

Notes

Energy infrastructure completed in 2010
Buildings and structures in Clark County, Nevada
Power stations in Nevada
Waste power stations in the United States
2010 establishments in Nevada